The 1973 Commonwealth Heads of Government Meeting, officially known as the II Commonwealth Heads Meeting, and commonly known as Ottawa 1973, was the second Meeting of the Heads of Government of the Commonwealth of Nations.  It was held from 2 to 10 August 1973 in Ottawa, and hosted by Prime Minister Pierre Trudeau.

The summit issued a Statement on Nuclear Weapon Tests that affirmed "the unfailing support of Commonwealth governments for the international Treaty banning nuclear weapon tests in the atmosphere, in outer space and under water. It appeals, furthermore, to the international community for a total ban on nuclear weapon tests in any environment." Also discussed were changing relationships among United States, the Soviet Union and the People's Republic of China, regional security, disarmament, the situation in the Middle East and South East Asia (i.e., the Vietnam War), the proposed creation of a peace zone in the Indian Ocean and the situation in Southern Africa and in particular Rhodesia's white minority rule government. Also discussed was the desirability of a worldwide expansion of trade through the General Agreement on Tariffs and Trade and negotiations between the European Economic Community and developing countries.

Besides the policy topics discussed, the CHOGM saw a number of incidental, but lasting, innovations that helped define the work of the Commonwealth.  The leaders held a private session in Mont-Tremblant, beginning the tradition of the 'retreat', whereby, in addition to the executive sessions, the heads of government leave the host city, taking only their spouses and one advisor each, to be isolated from outside influences and to discuss on less formal terms.

The Commonwealth flag emerged from pennants that were designed to be displayed on the leaders' cars in Ottawa.  Designed by Trudeau and Commonwealth Secretary-General Arnold Smith (a fellow Canadian), the flag was officially adopted three years later, on 26 March 1976.  Although the Royal Commonwealth Society petitioned the CHOGM to discuss creating a uniformly-observed Commonwealth Day, this would eventually be discussed, at the proposal of the Canadian delegation, at the 1975 Meeting, and the Canadian proposals adopted.

Queen Elizabeth did not attend the 1971 conference but attended the Ottawa conference on the advice of Prime Minister Trudeau, despite being advised against attending by British prime minister Edward Heath. She would attend all subsequent CHOGMs until absenting herself in 2013 when she began to refrain from long distance travel.

Footnotes

1973 conferences
1973 in Canada
1973 in international relations
1973 in politics
August 1973 events in Canada
20th-century diplomatic conferences
1970s in Ottawa
Canada and the Commonwealth of Nations
1973
Diplomatic conferences in Canada
Royal tours of Canada